Scopula confertaria is a moth of the family Geometridae. It was described by Francis Walker in 1861. It is found in Honduras and Ecuador.

References

Moths described in 1861
confertaria
Moths of Central America
Taxa named by Francis Walker (entomologist)